The Battle of Bezzecca was fought on 21 July 1866 between Italy and Austria, during the Third Italian Independence War.  The Italian force, the Hunters of the Alps, were led by Giuseppe Garibaldi, and had invaded Trentino as part of the general Italian offensive against the Austrian force occupying north-eastern Italy after the decisive Prussian victory of Battle of Königgrätz, which had led Austria to move part of their troops towards Vienna (see Invasion of Trentino).

The Austrians, commanded by Generalmajor Franz Kuhn von Kuhnenfeld, attacked and occupied the city of Bezzecca. The Italians uncoordinately tried to recover the lost town. Garibaldi himself, moving on the battlefield in a coach because of a wound from a previous encounter, was in danger of being captured. The Italian artillery took a hill close to the town, and an assault by the Italian infantry caused the Austrians to withdraw to their emplacements in the surrounding mountains, thus marking an Italian victory that cost many casualties.

While Garibaldi was preparing to continue the invasion toward Garda to take the forts of Lardaro, on 9 August he received the message of the armistice between Italy and Austria and the order of general La Marmora, commander-in-chief of the Piedmontese army, to abandon Trentino. On that occasion, in the square of Bezzecca, Giuseppe Garibaldi replied with the famous telegram, with only one word: "Obbedisco!" ("I obey!").

External links
 "Bruno Freiherr von Montluisant", biography of one of the Austrian commanders at Bezzecca.

Bezzecca
Bezzecca
Bezzeca
1866 in Italy
1866 in the Austrian Empire
July 1866 events
Ledro